The Prince William Board of County Supervisors is the policy-making body for the government of Prince William County, Virginia. The county is divided into seven magisterial districts: Brentsville, Coles, Gainesville, Neabsco, Occoquan, Potomac, and Woodbridge. The magisterial districts each elect one supervisor to the Board of Supervisors. There is also a Chairman elected by the county at-large, bringing total Board membership to 8. A Vice-Chairman and a Chairman Pro-Tem are selected by the Board from amongst its membership. The current Chairman is Democrat Ann Wheeler.

Responsibilities
The County operates under the county form of the County Executive system of government, with an elected Board of Supervisors. The Board then appoints a professional, nonpartisan County Executive to manage government agencies. The Board is responsible for setting local tax policy, approving land use plans and appointing officials to various countywide positions; including a County Executive who prepares the annual budget, and carries out laws enacted by the Board. The Board of Supervisors acts within the limits set forth by the Virginia General Assembly. The Board usually meets two Tuesdays every month in the Prince William County McCoart Administration Building, Board Chambers, 1 County Complex Court. Members of the public are invited to attend these meetings.

Membership
The board is currently controlled by Democrats, who have five out of the eight seats, and currently control both the Chairmanship and Vice Chairmanship. The current districts and their Supervisors are:

External links
 Official Website of Prince William County Government

County governing bodies in the United States
County government in Virginia
Prince William County, Virginia